Allacrotelsa is a genus of primitive insects belonging to the family Lepismatidae.

References

Fauna Europaea

Lepismatidae
Zygentoma
Insects of Europe
Taxa named by Filippo Silvestri